The National Professional Basketball League ( or LNBP) is the top professional basketball league in Mexico. The league was founded in 2000 with 10 teams.

Famous basketball players who have played in the league include Jamario Moon,  Dennis Rodman,  Sun Mingming,  Horacio Llamas and many others.

History

Foundation 
In January 2000, some teams of CIMEBA (Circuito Mexicano de Básquetbol), the national basketball league in Mexico at the time, exited the league, citing CIMEBA's financial difficulties, and decided to form a new league. On March 11, 2000 the league was founded in the city of Durango with 11 teams participating. These were the founding teams, with the respective city and state:

Algodoneros de la Comarca (Torreón, Coahuila)
Correcaminos Matamoros de la UAT (Matamoros, Tamaulipas)
Correcaminos Reynosa de la UAT (Reynosa, Tamaulipas)
Correcaminos Tampico de la UAT (Tampico, Tamaulipas)
Correcaminos Victoria de la UAT (Ciudad Victoria, Tamaulipas)
Dorados de Chiuhuahua	(Chihuahua, Chihuahua)
Garzas de Plata de la UAEH (Pachuca, Hidalgo)
Indios de la UACJ (Ciudad Juárez, Chihuahua)
La Ola Roja del Distrito Federal (Mexico City, Distrito Federal)
Osos de Saltillo (Saltillo, Coahuila)
Vaqueros de Agua Prieta (Agua Prieta, Sonora)

The first president was Modesto Robledo. The LNBP set out to support and develop professional basketball in Mexico. The first edition of the league started on August 7, 2000 and finished in December, with the regular season finishing on November 11 and the playoffs starting on November 14. The first game was played in Torreón between Algodoneros de Torreón and Dorados de Chihuahua at the Auditorio Municipal: Dorados won, 80–78. The league coexisted in its first seasons with CIMEBA.

Teams

<onlyinclude>

Format

Regular season 
The regular season is played in round-robin format in which the 8 best-placed teams qualify to the postseason. For every game won 2 points are added and for every game lost one point is added. For example: If team one played 10 games and won 7, losing the remaining 3, it would have 17 points; 14 points for the 7 games won and 3 points for the games lost.

Playoffs 
The eight top-seeded teams play each other. The 1st-placed team plays the 8th-place team while the 2nd plays the 7th and the 3rd plays the 6th and so on. The semi-finals are played like the quarterfinals while the Serie Final is played by the two teams remaining with the best-placed team having home field advantage.

List of champions

Championships

Copa Independencia winners
The Copa Independencia (Independence Cup) was a tournament created by the LNBP.

Former teams

Aguacateros de Michoacán
Águilas Rojas de San Juan del Río
Ángeles de Puebla
Algodoneros de la Comarca
Ángeles Guerreros de Acapulco 
Astros de Tecate
Barreteros de Zacatecas
Bravos de Piedras Negras
Bucaneros de Campeche
Caballeros de Culiacán
Capitanes de Ciudad de México
Cimarrones de Ensenada 
Cometas de Querétaro 
Coras de Nayarit
Correcaminos UAT Matamoros
Correcaminos UAT Reynosa
Correcaminos UAT Tampico
Cosmos de Tijuana
Estrellas Indebasquet del Distrito Federal
Gallos de Pelea de Ciudad Juárez
Gansos Salvajes UIC
Gambusinos de Fresnillo
Garzas de Plata UAEH
Garzas Guerreras UATX
Gigantes del Estado de México
Guerreros de Guerrero Cumple
Guerreros de Morelia
Guerreros del Norte
Halcones UV Córdoba
Huracanes de Tampico
Indios de Ciudad Juárez
Indios UACJ
Jaguares de la Bahía
Jefes de Fuerza Lagunera
Laguneros de La Comarca
Lechugueros de León
Leñadores de Durango
Lobos UAdeC
Lobos Grises UAD
Lobos Plateados de la BUAP
Loros UdeC
Mayas de Yucatán
Navegantes de Ensenada
Ola Roja del Distrito Federal
Ola Verde de Poza Rica
Osos de Guadalajara
Petroleros de Ciudad del Carmen
Pilares del Distrito Federal
Pioneros de Quintana Roo
Potros ITSON de Obregón
Santos de San Luis
Tecolotes UAG
Titanes Capital del Distrito Federal
Titánicos de León
Toros de Nuevo Laredo
Tuberos de Colima
Unión Zacatecas
Vaqueros de Agua Prieta
Volcanes del Estado de México
Zorros UMSNH

References

External links
Official site
Mexican league on Latinbasket.com 

  
    
2000 establishments in Mexico
Sports leagues established in 2000
Professional sports leagues in Mexico